Brood V is one of twelve extant broods of periodical cicadas that emerge as adults once every 17 years in North America (three additional broods emerge once every 13 years). They are expected to appear in the eastern half of Ohio, the southwestern corner of Pennsylvania, the upper two-thirds of West Virginia less the Eastern Panhandle, far western Maryland, and some places in Virginia abutting West Virginia. Also included in Brood V is a population that emerges in Suffolk County, Long Island, New York. They last emerged in 2016, and their next appearance will be in 2033.

Emergence

For about two weeks prior to emergence, they construct their tunnels, waiting for the temperature in the soil to reach  about  down. They then crawl out of their tunnels, climb up trees, and undergo a molt to the adult form. The males then began calling for mates.

Species
Brood V consists of three species of 17-year cicadas: Magicicada septendecim, Magicicada cassini, and Magicicada septendecula.

References

External links
 Brood V

Cicadas